HSLA may refer to:

 High-strength low-alloy steel
 Hue, saturation, lightness, alpha; see HSL and HSV
 High Speed Logarithmic Arithmetic, a European logarithmic research computer